Jakub Fulnek (born 26 April 1994) is a professional Czech football winger currently playing for FK Mladá Boleslav in the Czech First League.

Career

Mladá Boleslav
On 5 January 2019, Fulnek officially signed for FK Mladá Boleslav in the Czech First League.

References

External links

Jakub Fulnek official international statistics
Jakub Fulnek profile on FC Vysočina Jihlava website

Czech footballers
1994 births
Living people
Czech First League players
FC Vysočina Jihlava players
FC Silon Táborsko players
FK Mladá Boleslav players
Association football midfielders
Bohemians 1905 players
Czech National Football League players